Kathrin Schweinberger (born 29 October 1996) is an Austrian racing cyclist, who currently rides for UCI Women's Continental Team . She rode in the women's road race event at the 2017 UCI Road World Championships. Her twin sister Christina Schweinberger is also a professional cyclist for the  team.

Major results

Road

2011
3rd Road Race, National Novices Road Championships

2012
National Novices Road Championships
1st  Time Trial
1st  Road Race

2013
National Junior Road Championships
1st  Time Trial
3rd Road Race

2014
National Junior Road Championships
1st  Road Race
1st  Time Trial
1st Cham-Hagendorn
2014 Switzerland   1º in Cham-Hagendorn, (Cham, Juniors (F)), Cham (Zug), Switzerland 

2015
National Road Championships
4th Road Race
5th Time Trial

2017
5th Road Race, National Road Championships
10th Tour of Guangxi

2018
2nd Overall Tour of Uppsala
1st Points classification
1st Stage 2
2nd Diamond Tour
8th Volta Limburg Classic,

2019
2nd Grote Prijs Gemeente Kallo
3rd Road Race, National Road Championships
3rd SwissEver GP Cham-Hagendorn
3rd V4 Ladies Series - Restart Zalaegerszeg
4th Salverda Omloop van de IJsseldelta
4th MerXem Classic
5th Trofee Maarten Wynants
5th Spar Flanders Diamond Tour
8th Erondegemse Pijl
8th Flanders Ladies Classic

2020
1st  Road Race, National Road Championships

Track
2013 
 National Track Championships
1st  500m time trial
1st  Omnium
1st  Scratch
2nd Individual Pursuit
3rd Points Race

2014
3rd Individual Pursuit
2nd Points Race
2nd Scratch Race
2nd 500m Time Trial
2nd Omnium

2015
 National Track Championships
1st  500m time trial
1st  Omnium
1st  Scratch

References

External links

1996 births
Living people
Austrian female cyclists
European Games competitors for Austria
Cyclists at the 2019 European Games
People from Schwaz District
Sportspeople from Tyrol (state)
Twin sportspeople
Austrian twins
21st-century Austrian women